Đorđe "Đura" Horvatović (17 January 1835 – 28 February 1895) was a Serbian general and military minister.

From the Austrian army with the rank of lieutenant, he joined the Serbian Army in 1862. He distinguished himself in the First Serbian-Ottoman War (1876-1877), in which he commanded as a lieutenant colonel of the Knjaževac army. He was promoted to colonel and took command of the 4th Corps, whose part in the battle of Battle of Šumatovac attacked the right flank of the Turkish army and contributed to the victory of the Serbian army.

In the Second Serbian-Turkish War 1877-1878, he commanded the corps of Timok, with which on 24 December 1877 took Bela Palanka. Four days later in conjunction with the Šumadija corps, he took Pirot as well.

From 1881-85 he was a deputy in St. Petersburg, then commander of the active Army and its Minister (1886-1887).

See also
 Mihailo Ilić
 Ranko Alimpić
 Milojko Lešjanin
 Mikhail Chernyayev
 Nićifor Dučić
 František Zach
 Kosta Protić
 Sava Grujić
 Jovan Ristić
 Jovan Belimarković

References

1835 births
1895 deaths
People from Nova Gradiška
Serbian generals
Serbs of Croatia
Serbian–Turkish Wars (1876–1878)
People from the Principality of Serbia
Immigrants to the Principality of Serbia
Defence ministers of Serbia